Martha Marcy May Marlene is a 2011 American  psychological thriller- drama film written and directed by Sean Durkin, and starring Elizabeth Olsen (in her film debut), John Hawkes, Sarah Paulson, and Hugh Dancy. The plot focuses on a young woman suffering from delusions and paranoia after returning to her family from an abusive cult in the Catskill Mountains.

Plot
A 22-year-old woman named Martha has been living as a member of a cult in the Catskill Mountains for two years. The leader of the cult, Patrick, granted her the name Marcy May upon her initiation. Eventually, she decides to flee and escapes into the woods, arriving at a nearby town. In a diner restaurant, she is confronted by Watts, a cult member, who attempts to persuade her to return, but when she refuses, he lets her leave. Martha calls her sister Lucy, who picks her up and takes her to the vacation lake house in Connecticut that she shares with her husband, a successful and wealthy architect named Ted.

While staying with Lucy and Ted at the lake house, Martha begins exhibiting strange behavior by skinny dipping in a public lake, sleeping all the time, not eating, and arguing with her sister and brother-in-law about how to live, specifically arguing over the need for career and possessions. Lucy reveals she abandoned Martha and is now attempting to get her back into her life, while she and Ted are also trying to have their own child. One night, Martha climbs into bed with Ted and Lucy while they are having sex, angering Ted. Martha then attempts to phone the cult, but hangs up when one of the female members answers using the code name "Marlene Lewis".

In flashbacks, Martha recalls a series of disturbing events that led to her escape the cult: Martha became a member through her boyfriend, Watts. She was drugged and raped by Patrick in an initiation ritual, which she later facilitated for other incoming female members. Patrick would later urge her to kill a cat, which she refused to do. She subsequently began participating in burglaries with the other cultists, including one where they murdered a homeowner who walked in on them. After witnessing the murder, Martha had a mental breakdown before Patrick forcefully subdued her and berated her for her failing to follow the cult's ideals.

Lucy and Ted host a party at their home, inviting numerous friends from the city. Martha is visibly nervous during the gathering and has a psychotic episode when she misidentifies the bartender as a cult member, and needs to be sedated. Ted attempts to convince Lucy to send Martha to a psychiatric hospital, an idea Lucy rejects.

Later that night, Martha has a nightmare, concerning her moments with Patrick, and suffers a panic attack. Ted tries to calm her down, but Martha kicks him down the staircase. Lucy threatens to send Martha to a psychiatric hospital, to which Martha angrily responds that Lucy will be a terrible mother. The next day, Lucy and Martha somewhat reconcile, and Martha goes swimming. She sees a man watching her across the shore and leaves the water. When Martha departs the house with Lucy and Ted, she looks behind from the backseat of the car as another driver follows them.

Cast

Production
Sean Durkin started writing script of Martha Marcy May Marlene in 2007. When researching his script, Durkin read about what he calls "the big ones" of cults: Jonestown, the Manson family, the Unification Church of the United States and David Koresh. He realised he wanted to make something more experiential than political and downplayed the ideology and goals of the cult.

While researching, Durkin became fascinated by how someone gets into the farm or commune or group, and made a short film of the name Mary Last Seen about it starring Brady Corbet, who plays cult recruiter Watts in both the short and feature films. Mary Last Seen won the award for best short film at the 2010 Cannes Film Festival Directors' Fortnight. While Mary Last Seen was about how someone gets into the cult, Martha Marcy May Marlene was about what happens to someone when they get out of it. Durkin made the short to show the world Martha was in, and also with the intent to send it out with the script for Martha Marcy May Marlene to potential investors. Mary Last Seen was selected for the Sundance Film Festival, and Durkin was given a distribution deal with Fox Searchlight.

Durkin and cinematographer Jody Lee Lipes were inspired by the films Rosemary's Baby, 3 Women, Klute, Interiors, and Margot at the Wedding. The look of the film was particularly inspired by the last film.

Elizabeth Olsen admitted that her nude scenes were a bit odd to film, but said that simply diving into the water was far more perilous than taking her clothes off in front of a camera because "The lake was daunting", so "Some lake scenes we could only shoot once, because it was physically too cold for a body to be in there very long."

Release
Martha Marcy May Marlene premiered at the 2011 Sundance Film Festival in January, with Durkin winning the festival's U.S. Directing Award for Best Drama. It also screened in the Un Certain Regard section at the 2011 Cannes Film Festival and at the 36th Toronto International Film Festival on September 11, 2011. The film received a limited release in the United States on October 21, 2011.

In its opening weekend in limited release, Martha Marcy May Marlene grossed $137,651 in the United States. 20th Century Fox Home Entertainment released Martha Marcy May Marlene on DVD and Blu-ray on February 21, 2012.

Reception
Martha Marcy May Marlene received highly positive reviews, with Olsen's performance as the traumatized Martha met with critical acclaim; the film holds a 90% "fresh" rating on Rotten Tomatoes, with the consensus capsule stating, "Led by a mesmerizing debut performance from Elizabeth Olsen, Martha Marcy May Marlene is a distinctive, haunting psychological drama." On Metacritic the film has a 75 out of 100 score on 39 critic reviews, indicating "generally favorable reviews".  Christy Lemire of the Associated Press named Martha Marcy May Marlene the best film of 2011. Roger Ebert gave the film three-and-a-half out of four stars, describing Olsen as "a genuine discovery ... She has a wide range of emotions to deal with here, and in her first major role, she seems instinctively to know how to do that." Ebert's only major complaint was that the movie's chronological shifts were "a shade too clever. In a serious film, there is no payoff for trickery." In contrast, Peter Bradshaw of The Guardian felt that the flashbacks were "cleverly and indirectly" structured throughout the film, and ultimately rated it with four stars out of five.

Accolades

References

Bibliography
 Vizcarrondo, Sara Maria, "Martha Marcy May Marlene", Box Office Magazine, September 12, 2011
 Zakarin, Jordan, "'Martha Marcy May Marlene' Director, Producers Talk Cults, Time Shifts & Elizabeth Olsen", The Huffington Post, September 12, 2011

External links
 
 
 
 

2011 films
2011 directorial debut films
2011 independent films
2011 psychological thriller films
2011 thriller drama films
2010s English-language films
2010s mystery thriller films
American independent films
American mystery thriller films
American psychological thriller films
American thriller drama films
Features based on short films
Films about cults
Films about post-traumatic stress disorder
Films about rape in the United States
Films about runaways
Films set in Connecticut
Films set in New York (state)
Films shot in New York (state)
Fox Searchlight Pictures films
2010s American films